Michael or Mike Barker may refer to:

Michael Barker (British Army officer) (1884–1960), British Army general
Michael Barker (drummer) (born 1966), New Zealand percussionist
Michael Barker (judge), of the Supreme Court of Western Australia and the Federal Court of Australia
Michael Barker (executive), co-president and co-founder of Sony Pictures Classics
Mike Barker (director) (born 1965), film and television director 
Mike Barker (producer) (born 1968), co-creator of American Dad!
Mickey Barker (born 1956), English football player